Jazz for a Rainy Afternoon is a compilation album by various jazz artists. It is meant to be a background record and played at a low volume, as written in the liner notes by Joel Dorn, the compilation producer.

Critical reception

Scott Yanow of AllMusic says that while all of the performances are available elsewhere, the overall atmosphere is pleasing.

Track listing

Musicians

1. "'Round Midnight"
Charles Brown – Piano

2. "Spring Can Really Hang You Up the Most"
Houston Person – Tenor Saxophone 
Ron Carter – Bass

3. "Everything Must Change"
David "Fathead" Newman – Soprano Saxophone
Marcus Belgrave – Flugelhorn
Cedar Walton – Electric Piano
Buster Williams – Bass
Louis Hayes – Drums

4. "A Tribute to a Rose"
Jimmy Ponder – Guitar

5. "Blue in Green"
Wallace Roney – Trumpet
Gary Thomas – Tenor Saxophone
Mulgrew Miller – Piano
Charnett Moffett – Bass
Tony Williams – Drums

6. "Talk of the Town"
Houston Person – Tenor Saxophone 
Stan Hope – Piano
Buster Williams – Bass
Grady Tate – Drums

7. "Ruby, My Dear"
Hank Jones – Piano
George Duvivier – Bass
Ben Riley – Drums

8. "I Can't Get Started"
Warren Vaché – Cornet
Richard Wyands – Piano
Michael Moore – Bass
Billy Hart – Drums

9. "My Ideal"
Sonny Criss – Alto Saxophone
Dolo Coker – Piano
Larry Gales – Bass
Jimmie Smith – Drums

10. "St. Louis Blues"
Johnny Lytle – Vibraphone
Melvin Sparks – Guitar
David Braham – Organ
Peter Martin Weiss – Bass
Greg Bandy – Drums

11. "Imagination"
Woody Shaw – Trumpet
Kirk Lightsey – Piano
Steve Turre – Trombone
Ray Drummond – Bass
Carl Allen – Drums

Production

Joel Dorn – Compilation Producer, Liner Notes
Richard Ables – Producer (Track 7)
Bob Porter – Producer (Track 9)
Tony Williams – Producer (Track 5)
Don Sickler – Producer (Track 8, 11)
Fred Seibert – Producer (Track 7)
Houston Person – Producer (Track 1, 2, 4, 6, 10)
Michael Cuscuna – Producer (Track 3, 5)

Track information and credits adapted from the album's liner notes.

Charts

References

Jazz compilation albums
1998 compilation albums